__notoc__

Micro stuttering is a term used in computing to describe a quality defect that manifests as irregular delays between frames rendered by the GPU(s), causing the instantaneous frame rate of the longest delay to be significantly lower than the frame rate reported by benchmarking applications, such as 3DMark, as they usually calculate the average frame rate over a longer time interval.

In lower frame rates when this effect may be apparent the moving video appears to stutter, resulting in a degraded gameplay experience in the case of a video game, even though the frame rate seems high enough to provide a smooth experience. Single-GPU configurations do not suffer from this defect in most cases and can in some cases output a subjectively smoother video compared to a multi-GPU setup using the same video card model.  Micro stuttering is inherent to multi-GPU configurations using alternate frame rendering (AFR), such as Nvidia SLi and AMD CrossFireX but can also exist in certain cases in single-GPU systems.

The effects of micro stuttering vary depending on the application and driver optimizations. Beyond dual-GPU setups, CrossFireX/SLI setups do not seem to be as affected by micro-stuttering; the frame rate variability in a three-way CrossFireX/SLI setup approaches the smoothness achieved by a single GPU.

As of May 2012, with the latest release of hardware and drivers from Nvidia and AMD, AMD's Radeon HD 7000 series is severely more affected by micro stuttering than Nvidia's GeForce 600 Series. In tests performed in Battlefield 3, a configuration with two GeForce GTX 680 in SLi-mode showed a 7% variation in frame delays, compared to 5% for a single GTX 680. A configuration with two Radeon HD 7970 in CrossFireX-mode, on the other hand, showed an 85% variation in frame delays, compared to 7% for a single card, indicating large amounts of micro stuttering. These results are reflected in the perceptual experience when looking at the video in output.

The software program RadeonPro can be used to significantly reduce or eliminate the effects of micro-stuttering when using AMD graphics cards in CrossFire.

See also 
 AMD CrossFireX
 Graphics processing unit (GPU)
 Jitter
 Nvidia SLi
 Rendering
 Screen tearing
 Video card

Notes

References

External links 
 Micro-Stuttering And GPU Scaling In CrossFire And SLI – Tom's Hardware
 Inside the second: A new look at game benchmarking – Tech Report
 How To Fix CrossFire Micro-Stuttering – ShareNoesis

Graphics hardware